The world's navigable airspace is divided into three-dimensional segments, each of which is assigned to a specific class. Most nations adhere to the classification specified by the International Civil Aviation Organization (ICAO) and described below, though they might use only some of the classes defined below, and significantly alter the exact rules and requirements. Similarly, individual nations may also designate special use airspace (SUA) with further rules for reasons of national security or safety.

Abbreviations used in this article

ICAO definitions 
On March 12, 1990, ICAO adopted the current airspace classification scheme. The classes are fundamentally defined in terms of flight rules and interactions between aircraft and air traffic control (ATC). Generally speaking, the ICAO airspaces allocate the responsibility for avoiding other aircraft, namely either to ATC (if separation is provided) or to the aircraft commander (if not).

Some key concepts are:
Separation: Maintaining a specific minimum distance between an aircraft and another aircraft or terrain to avoid collisions, normally by requiring aircraft to fly at set levels or level bands, on set routes or in certain directions, or by controlling an aircraft's speed.
Clearance: Permission given by ATC for an aircraft to proceed under certain conditions contained within the clearance.
Traffic information: Information given by ATC on the position and, if known, intentions of other aircraft likely to pose a hazard to flight.
 Flight rules: Aircraft can operate under visual flight rules (VFR) or instrument flight rules (IFR). There is also an intermediate form, special visual flight rules (SVFR).

ICAO adopted classifications

Note: These are the ICAO definitions. Country-specific adaptations (such as "two-way communications" instead of "clearance" for Class C in the US) are discussed in the sections below. 

Class A: All operations must be conducted under IFR. All aircraft are subject to ATC clearance. All flights are separated from each other by ATC.
Class B: Operations may be conducted under IFR, SVFR, or VFR. All aircraft are subject to ATC clearance. All flights are separated from each other by ATC.
Class C: Operations may be conducted under IFR, SVFR, or VFR. All aircraft are subject to ATC clearance (country-specific variations notwithstanding). Aircraft operating under IFR and SVFR are separated from each other and from flights operating under VFR, but VFR flights are not separated from each other. Flights operating under VFR are given traffic information in respect of other VFR flights.
Class D: Operations may be conducted under IFR, SVFR, or VFR. All flights are subject to ATC clearance (country-specific variations notwithstanding). Aircraft operating under IFR and SVFR are separated from each other, and are given traffic information in respect of VFR flights. Flights operating under VFR are given traffic information in respect of all other flights.
Class E: Operations may be conducted under IFR, SVFR, or VFR. Aircraft operating under IFR and SVFR are separated from each other, and are subject to ATC clearance. Flights under VFR are not subject to ATC clearance. As far as is practical, traffic information is given to all flights in respect of VFR flights.
Class F: Operations may be conducted under IFR or VFR. ATC separation will be provided, so far as practical, to aircraft operating under IFR. Traffic Information may be given as far as is practical in respect of other flights.
Class G: Operations may be conducted under IFR or VFR. ATC has no authority but VFR minimums are to be known by pilots. Traffic Information may be given as far as is practical in respect of other flights.
Special Airspace: these may limit pilot operation in certain areas. These consist of Prohibited areas, Restricted areas, Warning Areas, MOAs (military operation areas), Alert areas and Controlled firing areas (CFAs), all of which can be found on the flight charts.

Classes A–E are referred to as controlled airspace. Classes F and G are uncontrolled airspace.

The table below provides an overview of the above classes, and the specifications for each.

Use of airspace classes
Each national aviation authority determines how it uses the ICAO classifications in its airspace design. In some countries, the rules are modified slightly to fit the airspace rules and air traffic services that existed before the ICAO standardisation.

Australia
Australia has adopted a civil airspace system based on the United States National Airspace System (NAS):

Class A is used above FL 180 along the populated coastal areas, and above FL 245 elsewhere.
Class B is not used.
Class C is used in a 360° funnel shape in the Terminal Control Zones of the major international airports, extending up to the base of the Class A, generally at FL 180 over these airports. It also overlays Class D airspace at smaller airports.
Class D is used for the Terminal Control Zones of medium-sized airports, extending from the surface up to  AGL (depicted in MSL on a chart). Above this, Class C airspace is used, although generally only in a sector, and not 360° around the airport.
Class F is not used.
Class G is used wherever other classes are not—almost always from the surface to the base of the overlying Class A, C, D or E airspace.

Transition from GAAP to Class D
Australia used to have a non-standard class of airspace for use at the capital city general aviation airports, called a General Aviation Airport Procedures Zone (GAAP Zone). A control tower provided procedural clearances for all aircraft inside the zone. Additionally, any aircraft operating within  of the zone must obtain a clearance. VFR aircraft arrive and depart using standard arrival and departure routes, while instrument arrival and departure procedures are published for IFR operations. During visual meteorological conditions (VMC), IFR aircraft are not provided with full IFR services. During instrument meteorological conditions (IMC), or marginal VMC, VFR operations are restricted in order to facilitate full IFR service for IFR aircraft.

In June 2010, all GAAP aerodromes were changed to Class D aerodromes, and the previous Class D procedures were changed. The new Class D procedures are similar to the FAA Class D procedures. VFR aircraft are no longer required to enter the airspace via set inbound/outbound points, however can be directed there by ATC. VFR and IFR aircraft now require taxi clearance in the "manoeuvring area" of the aerodrome, but can still taxi within set apron areas without a clearance. IFR aircraft now receive slot times and the visibility requirements of Special VFR are reduced from 3000m visibility to 1600m.

Canada

There are seven airspace classes in use in Canada (letters A through G), but the letters do not always correspond with ICAO definitions.

Denmark
Class A is generally used above FL195.
Class B is not used.
Class C is used for busy terminal areas, namely Billund TMA and København TMA. All airspace above FL195 is also class C.
Class D is used for all control zones and most terminal areas.
Class E is generally used for all airspace from 3500 feet to FL195, with the exception of TMA's and airspace over the North Sea.
Class F is not used.
Class G is used below 3500 feet, except around controlled airports, and below FL195 over the North Sea.

Estonia
In Estonia, airspace is divided into only classes C, D and G. 

Class C is used for enroute airspace, between FL095 and FL 660.
Class D is used for the Ämari CTR, and Tartu TMA and CTR, during operational hours.
Class G is used below FL095, in the Kuressaare, Pärnu, and Kärdla FIZs, and Tartu TMA & CTR, outside of operational hours.

Germany
In Germany, Classes A and B are not used at all. Airspace is divided into lower airspace below FL 245 and upper airspace above FL 245.

Class A is not used.
Class B is not used.
Class C is used for controlled zones above and around airports and for airspace above FL 100 (or FL 130 near the Alps) up to FL 660.
Class D is used for controlled zones, or above and around airspace Class C designated zones where CVFR is not necessary.
Class E is used for airspace between usually  AGL (around airports  or  AGL) and FL 100.
Class F is not used.
IFR flights in Class G are not allowed in Germany except for arrivals and departures in Radio Mandatory Zones (RMZ) around uncontrolled airfields with IFR procedures.

Iraq
In Iraq, the Flight Information Regions (FIR) is known as Baghdad FIR. It is  classified into Class A, D, E and G airspace. Class B, C and F airspace are not used in the Baghdad FIR. Air traffic services are provided in all controlled airspace, by the controlling ATC Unit, based on an ATS Surveillance System (supplemented by procedural non-ATS Surveillance System procedures) or MRU where authorized based on Procedural (non- ATC Surveillance System) procedures and supplemented by ATC Surveillance System where possible.
    
Class A is established from FL235 – FL460 throughout the whole Baghdad FIR.
Class B is not used.
Class C is not used.
Class D is established in conjunction with airports that have operating control towers. 
Class E is established at Baghdad, Basrah, Kirkuk, and Mosul TMAs. Class E airspace is also established along the air route structure.
Class F is not used.
Class G is established for all areas that are not classified as A, D or E. This airspace is primarily used by military VFR aircraft. A Common Traffic Advisory Frequency (CTAF) is established for aircraft self deconfliction.

Ireland
In Ireland, airspace is divided into classes A, C and G only. 

Class A: This high-level en route controlled airspace is used predominately by commercial and passenger jets. Only IFR flights are permitted and they require ATC clearance. Class A airspace exists in the Northern Oceanic Transition Area (NOTA) and the Southern Oceanic Transition Area (SOTA).
Class C: This is the controlled airspace above 7,500 feet and surrounding major airports. Both IFR and VFR flights are permitted and both require ATC clearance and separation service is to be provided by ATC.
Class G: This airspace is uncontrolled. Both IFR and VFR aircraft are permitted and neither requires an ATC clearance.

Italy

Class A is used for Rome and Milan TMAs
Class B is not used.
Class C is used in all airspace above FL 195, and in Military Control Zones above FL 195, to FL 460 excluded.
Class D is used for controlled zones and other TMAs.
Class E is used for airways from MEL to FL 115.
Class F is not used.
Class G is used in all other airspaces, and above FL460

Kenya

Classes A, C, D, G are used in Kenyan airspace, alongside unclassified military operation areas which are defined in Restricted Areas and Prohibited Areas, and are controlled by military air traffic control units.

Class A is used above FL145, except in areas where ground level exceeds FL145, in which case class A airspace exists above  AGL and class G below.
Class C airspace is used exclusively in the Nairobi TMA and CTR.
Class D airspace is used in all other aerodrome airspaces.
Class G airspace exists everywhere else, particularly between ground level and  AGL.

Lithuania
In Lithuania, Classes A and B are generally not used at all. Classes C and D are used in the following areas of controlled airspace of the Republic of Lithuania:

in control zones (CTR)
in terminal control areas (TCA)
in control area (CTA)
in upper control area (UTA)

Mauritius
Classes A, C and G are used in Mauritius.
Class A airspace exists within the entire Mauritius FIR (Flight Information Region), above FL245.
Class C airspace exists within 150 nautical miles of Mauritius, below FL245 (Mauritius TMA and CTR).
Class G airspace exists in all other areas of the Mauritius FIR.

Netherlands
In the Netherlands, a relatively large part of the country is Class A airspace. Near Amsterdam, the capital of the Netherlands, the airspace is almost completely built up with class A. It starts at 1500' MSL, and ends at FL195. Further away from Amsterdam and its airport Schiphol, Class A starts at a higher altitude. Class B is used a lot as well. Anywhere in the Netherlands, Class A airspace ends at FL195 and changes into Class C. Most of the CTRs are class D, some of them are class C. Class F is the only class that cannot be found in the Dutch airspace.

New Zealand
In New Zealand, Classes B, E and F are not used at all. Class A is used in Oceanic airspace above flight level (FL) 245 whereas Classes C and D are used in domestic airspace as part of the New Zealand FIR.

Class A is used at or above 24,500 ft or FL245 in the Auckland Oceanic Flight Information Region.
Class B is not used.
Class C is used for control zones around major airports and associated surrounding control areas and en-route airspace in the New Zealand Flight Information Region. 
Class D is used for control zones around regional airports and military airbases.
Class E is not used.
Class F is not used.
Class G is used for all other airspace.

Norway
In Norway, airspace is divided into classes A, C, D and G.

Class A is only used for Bodø OCA, FL195 and up.
Class C is used for controlled airspace.
Class D is used for controlled airspace where C is not used.
Class G is used elsewhere. G* is used in TIZ and TIA where two-way radio communication is required during opening hours.

Russia
Russia adopted a modified version of ICAO airspace classification on November 1, 2010. The division into classes for the airspace of the Russian Federation was introduced for the first time in the history of Russia.

The airspace above the territory of the Russian Federation is divided as follows:

Class A applies to airspace above and including 8100 m (the boundary between lower and upper airspace in Russia). All operations in Class A airspace must follow IFR and are separated from each other by ATC. Permanent two-way radio contact with ATC is required. Permission for using airspace is required except for the special cases listed in clause 114 of the Federal rules for using Russian air space.
Class B is not used.
Class C airspace is defined below  and allows IFR and VFR operations. Both IFR and VFR operations are required to have permanent two-way radio contact with ATC. IFR flights are separated from each other and from VFR flights. VFR flights are separated from IFR flights and are provided traffic information about other VFR flights. Permission for using airspace is required except for the special cases listed in clause 114 of the Federal rules for using Russian air space.
Class D is not used.
Class E is not used.
Class F is not used.
Class G airspace is defined wherever Class A and Class C airspaces are not defined. Class G airspace allows IFR and VFR operations. For altitudes less than  the speed must not exceed . Flights are provided with flight information service as requested. IFR flights are required to have permanent two-way radio contact with ATC. No separation is provided by ATC. No permission for using airspace is required.

Airspace controlled by Russia outside the territory of Russia has different division into classes and includes redefined Class A and Class G, but no class C airspace.

Specific boundaries of airspaces are determined by the Order of the Ministry of Transport of the Russian Federation #199 of September 15, 2010.

Sweden

In Sweden, airspace is divided into airspace class C and G only with a small E class area stretching over the Danish border into Swedish airspace.

Class C is used for all controlled airspace.
Class E is used for Area L3, a small area southwest of Sweden, within Sweden FIR but controlled by ACC København.
Class G is used elsewhere.

United Kingdom

In addition the UK has a couple of special classes of airspace that do not fall within the ICAO classes:

Aerodrome traffic zones (ATZ) are circular zones around an airport with a radius of 2 nmi or 2.5 nmi depending on runway length, extending from the surface to  AAL (above aerodrome level). Aircraft within an ATZ must obey the instructions of the tower controller (if present), or must make radio contact with the Aerodrome Flight Information Service unit or Air/Ground Communication Service unit for the aerodrome before entering the zone (in the case of an uncontrolled airfield), or must obey ground signals if non-radio.
Military air traffic zones (MATZ) are zones around military air bases in class G airspace. Military aircraft treat these as if they are controlled airspace; civilian traffic are advised but not obliged to do the same (although they must respect the ATZ contained within the MATZ). A MATZ usually consists of a circular zone with a radius of 5 nm, extending from the surface to  AAL (above aerodrome level).

United States

The U.S. adopted a slightly modified version of the ICAO system on September 16, 1993, when regions of airspace designated according to older classifications were converted entirely. The exceptions are some terminal radar service areas (TRSA), which have special rules and still exist in a few places.

Above FL600, the airspace reverts to Class E. The transition altitude is also consistently  everywhere. All operations in US Class A airspace must be conducted under IFR. SVFR flight in Class A airspace is prohibited.
Class B airspace is used to control the flow of traffic around major airports. The airspace is charted on a VFR sectional chart with a series of blue lines. Within these blue lines, the floor and the ceiling of the Class B airspace is defined. The lateral boundaries of Class B airspace are individually tailored to facilitate arriving and departing traffic operating under IFR. Class B airspace extends from the surface to generally  MSL. In Denver, Colorado and Salt Lake City, Utah, the ceiling is at  MSL, while in Phoenix, Arizona, the ceiling is at  MSL. Charts must be consulted for the most current floor and ceiling information. Aircraft must establish two-way radio communication with ATC and obtain a clearance to enter Class B airspace. All aircraft operating inside or within 30 NM of the primary Class B airport(s) are required to have a transponder with Mode C. The 30 NM Mode C Veil is denoted on VFR charts by a thin magenta line. VFR traffic must remain clear of clouds and maintain 3 SM of visibility while operating within Class B airspace.
Class C airspace is used around airports with a moderate traffic level.
Class D is used for smaller airports that have a control tower. The U.S. uses a modified version of the ICAO class C and D airspace, where only radio contact with ATC rather than an ATC clearance is required for VFR operations.
Other controlled airspace is designated as Class E, this includes a large part of the lower airspace. Class E airspace exists in many forms. It can serve as a surface-based extension to Class D airspace to accommodate IFR approach/departure procedure areas. Class E airspace can be designated to have a floor of 700' AGL or 1,200' AGL, or a customized floor of any other altitude. Class E airspace exists above Class G surface areas from 14,500' MSL to 18,000 MSL. Federal airways from 1,200 AGL to 18,000 MSL within  of the centerline of the airway is designated Class E airspace. Airspace at any altitude over FL600 (60,000 MSL) (the ceiling of Class A airspace) is designated Class E airspace.
The U.S. does not use ICAO Class F.
Class G (uncontrolled) airspace is mostly used for a small layer of airspace near the ground, but there are larger areas of Class G airspace in remote regions.

Airspace classes and VFR

Authorities use the ICAO definitions to derive additional rules for VFR cloud clearance, visibility, and equipment requirements.

For example, consider Class E airspace. It is possible that an aircraft operating under VFR is not in communication with ATC, so it is imperative that its pilot be able to see and avoid other aircraft (and vice versa). That includes IFR flights emerging from a cloud, so the VFR flight must keep a designated distance from the edges of clouds above, below, and laterally, and must maintain at least a designated visibility, to give the two aircraft time to observe and avoid each other. The low-level speed limit of 250 knots does not apply above , so the visibility requirements are higher.

On the other hand, in Class B and Class C airspaces, separation is provided by ATC to all aircraft. In these situations the VFR pilot only needs to see where his/her own aircraft is going, so visibility requirements are less stringent, and there is no designated minimum distance from clouds.

Similar considerations determine whether a VFR aircraft must use a two-way radio and/or a transponder.

Special use airspace

Each national authority designates areas of special use airspace (SUA), primarily for reasons of national security. This is not a separate classification from the ATC-based classes; each piece of SUA is contained in one or more zones of letter-classed airspace.

SUAs range in restrictiveness, from areas where flight is always prohibited except to authorized aircraft, to areas that are not charted but are used by military for potentially hazardous operations (in this case, the onus is on the military personnel to avoid conflict). Refer to the external links for more specific details.

References

External links 
Airspace in the U.S., from the FAA's Aeronautical Information Manual
UK Manual of Air Traffic Services, Part 1
US Airspace Aeronautical Charts

Air traffic control
Classification systems by subject

de:Luftraum#Luftraumstruktur